Versão Acústica 3 is the third album by Brazilian Acoustic rock musician Emmerson Nogueira. It features covers of hits from many famous bands and musicians, like U2, Phil Collins, Toto, Bryan Adams, and more.

Track listing

2003 albums
Covers albums
Emmerson Nogueira albums